You Are My Only Love  is a 1993 Russian drama film directed by Dmitry Astrakhan.

Plot 
The film tells about a boxer who has become an engineer, whom a beautiful and rich woman calls with him to America. But the problem is that he never wanted to live in America and wants to stay at home with his wife.

Cast 
 Aleksandr Zbruyev as Timoshin  
 Mark Goronok as Timoshin in  youth
 Marina Neyolova as Natasha  
 Mariya Lobachova as Natasha  in  youth
 Svetlana Ryabova as Anya  
 Ksenia Morozova as Anya in  childhood
 Maria Klenskaya as Olya  
 Viktor Gogolev as father 
 Irina Mazurkevich as Sinka
 Alexander Lykov as gay prostitute
 Alexander Slastin as mayor's office representative
 Aleksey Shevchenkov as student

Awards
 Nika Award 1993: Best Actress   (Marina Neyolova)

References

External links 
 

1993 films
1990s Russian-language films
1993 romantic drama films
Russian romantic drama films
Lenfilm films
Films about immigration to the United States
Films set in Saint Petersburg
Films directed by Dmitry Astrakhan